Mississippi Damned is a 2009 American drama film directed by Tina Mabry and starring Tessa Thompson, D. B. Woodside, Malcolm Goodwin, Malcolm David Kelley and Michael Hyatt.  The film was written and directed by Tina Mabry, based on her life growing up in Tupelo, Mississippi. It was filmed in and around Ahoskie, North Carolina.

Plot
Taking place in 1986 and 1998 and based on a true story, three poor black kids in rural Mississippi reap the consequences of their family's cycle of abuse, addiction, and violence. They independently struggle to escape their circumstances and must decide whether to confront what's plagued their family for generations or succumb to the same crippling fate, forever damned in Mississippi. Writer/director Tina Mabry captures growing up in a world where possibilities and opportunities seem to die in the face of the suffocating reality of physical and sexual abuse, obsession, and a myriad of destructive compulsions.

In 1986, teenage cousins Leigh and Sammy, and Leigh's younger sister Kari, watch as their mothers and aunts struggle to maintain a roof over their heads. Leigh, a closeted lesbian, is devastated when her girlfriend announces she is marrying a man. Leigh attacks him and is arrested and kicked out of her parents' house. Sammy, a talented basketball player, is sexually abused by an older man. He accepts pay for sexual acts in order to get the money he needs to support his burgeoning basketball career. After Sammy's mother stabs her boyfriend's lover and is arrested, Sammy is taken in by his aunt. He rapes his younger cousin Kari, Leigh's sister.

By 1998, the three characters are adults. Leigh is still hung up on her old girlfriend and continues to make unwelcome visits to her. Sammy, a former professional basketball player, is out of work due to an injury. His pride and previous fame make him reluctant to take the minimum wage job he needs to support his wife and child. Kari, a talented pianist who has delayed college for years to take care of her cancer-stricken mother, is waiting to hear if she has been accepted by a musical conservatory. As she struggles to save money for school, she feels bound by family and friends, most of whom have no money to lend her or are financially dependent on her.

She eventually turns to Sammy for money. Although he gives it to her, she is disgusted and ashamed for having asked him.  Sammy, feeling rejected by his wife, begins to seduce his son's underage teenage babysitter. When he is caught by his wife, she contacts the police. He commits suicide.

Kari eventually learns that her mother's cancer has returned and her father has been laid off work. She gives her parents Sammy's money and decides not to go to school. When she tells her aunt of her decision, her aunt urges her to go, warning her that if she does not leave now she is unlikely to ever go. Kari learns that she has been accepted to school in New York. Shortly after, she discovers that her aunt has died, leaving her $25,000 in life insurance for school. Kari realizes that her aunt committed suicide by ceasing to take her diabetic medication. Kari packs up her things and leaves Mississippi, heading north toward school.

Cast
 Tonea Stewart as Alice
 Adam Clark as Junior Peterson
 Michael Hyatt as Delores Peterson 
 Chasity Kershal Hammitte as Leigh Peterson
 Kylee Russell as Young Kari Peterson
 Tessa Thompson as Kari Peterson
 Jossie Harris as Charlie Stone
 Malcolm David Kelley as Young Sammy
 Malcolm Goodwin as Sammy Stone
 Cynthia Addai-Robinson as Milena Stone
 Simbi Khali as Anna Tensely
 D.B. Woodside as Tyrone Tensely
 Michael Beasley as James
 Donna Biscoe as Gloria
 Southey Blanton as Irv
 Benjamin Brown as Ray

Reception

Critical response
When the film was screened at the NewFest film festival in New York City, Variety film critic Ronnie Scheib, praised the film, writing, "For the black men, women and children in Mississippi Damned, Tina Mabry's autobiographical saga of intertwined destinies, that southern state epitomizes a domestic hell of borderline poverty and endemic abuse. Complex family trees sometimes make for tough narrative sledding, but the thicket of obligations, traumas and betrayals that entrap the 'damned' here are well worth any momentary confusion. Mabry brilliantly captures a community as organic as it is dead-end, and the tortured legacy behind simplistic notions of ever escaping it. The NewFest audience award-winner demands strong critical support to overcome its downbeat subject matter and lack of a star draw."

The Philadelphia Inquirer film critic, Steven Rea, lauded the actors, writing, "Kelley (Walt Lloyd in Lost), Jasmin Burke and Jossie Thacker are among the busy ensemble whose exceptionally fine performances elevate what could have been a pile-it-on melodrama into something deeper and more unsettling."

Accolades

Wins
 American Black Film Festival: Grand Jury Prize, Best Actor, Tessa Thompson; Best Narrative Feature; 2009.
 Atlanta Film Festival: Special Jury Award, Narrative Breakthrough; 2009.
 Black Reel Awards: Black Reel, Outstanding Independent Feature, Tina Mabry; 2009.
 Chicago International Film Festival: Gold Hugo, Best Film; Gold Plaque, Best Screenplay, Tina Mabry; Best Supporting Actress, Jossie Thacker; 2009.
 New York Lesbian, Gay, Bisexual, & Transgender Film Festival: Audience Award, Narrative Feature; 2009.
 Outfest: 	Grand Jury Award, Outstanding US Dramatic Feature; 2009.
 Philadelphia Film Festival: Jury Award, Best American Independent Film; 2009.

Distribution
Despite a successful festival run, the film was unable to find distribution. The producer distributed it into a few theatres. In 2011, it premiered on Showtime, and in 2015, it was made available through Netflix via distributor ARRAY.

References

External links
 
 
 Tina Mabry interview at Star-News Online

2009 films
2009 drama films
African-American drama films
African-American LGBT-related films
American independent films
American LGBT-related films
2000s English-language films
2000s feminist films
Lesbian-related films
Films set in the 1980s
Films shot in North Carolina
2009 LGBT-related films
2009 independent films
2000s American films